Arg-e Now Juy (also Romanized as Arg-e Now Jūy and Arg Now Jūy; also known as Arg-e Now Jūdī, Ark, Arqeh-ye Now Jūy, and ‘Arq-i-Nu Jūi) is a village in Pirakuh Rural District, in the Central District of Jowayin County, Razavi Khorasan Province, Iran. At the 2006 census, its population was 763, in 176 families.

See also 

 List of cities, towns and villages in Razavi Khorasan Province

References 

Populated places in Joveyn County